is a national highway connecting Okayama and Takamatsu in Japan.

Route data
Length: 26.4 km (16.4 mi)
Origin: Okayama (originates at the origin of Routes 53 and 180, the terminus of Route 250) 
Terminus: Takamatsu (ends at junction with Route 11)
Major cities: Tamano

History
1952-12-04 - First Class National Highway 30 (from Okayama to Takamatsu)
1965-04-01 - General National Highway 30 (from Okayama to Takamatsu)

Intersects with

Okayama Prefecture
Kagawa Prefecture

References

030
Roads in Kagawa Prefecture
Roads in Okayama Prefecture